Lady in the Spa (German:Madame im Strandbad) is a 1929 Austrian silent comedy film directed by Edmund Hahn and starring Maximilian Kraemer, Betty Bird and Helen von Münchofen. A small spa town tries to give the impression that it is actually a much more important place than it really is.

Cast
 Maximilian Kraemer as Journalist 
 Betty Bird as Mabel Smith 
 Helen von Münchofen as Yvette 
 Oskar Marion as Der Sekretär 
 Robert Garrison as Jonathan Goldfisch 
 Albert Paulig as Der Badeddirektor 
 Leo Salvotti as Jonathan Gold

References

Bibliography
 Prawer, S.S. Between Two Worlds: The Jewish Presence in German and Austrian Film, 1910-1933. Berghahn Books, 2005.

External links

1929 films
1929 comedy films
Austrian silent feature films
Austrian comedy films
Austrian black-and-white films
Silent comedy films